Arfa Siddiq Kakar (born 28 January 1987), also spelled Arifa Siddique, is a politician and human rights activist from the town of Muslim Bagh in northern Balochistan, Pakistan. She is a supporter of the Pashtun Tahafuz Movement (PTM). From 2013 to 2018, she was a member of the Provincial Assembly of Balochistan as a candidate from the Pashtunkhwa Milli Awami Party (PMAP). She comes from the Kakar tribe of Pashtuns.

Early life and education
Siddiq was born on 28 January 1987 in Muslim Bagh in the Killa Saifullah District of Balochistan, Pakistan. She has done Bachelor of Science in Information Technology and Master of Arts in Political Science.

Political career
Siddiq was elected to the Provincial Assembly of Balochistan as a candidate of Pashtunkhwa Milli Awami Party (PMAP) on a reserved seat for women in 2013 Pakistani general election.

Detention in Loralai
On 9 February 2020, just before PTM's public gathering in Loralai to mark the first death anniversary of Arman Loni, security forces arrested Arfa Siddiq, Wranga Loni, Sanna Ejaz, and other female PTM activists as they were on their way to the gathering site. The security forces released them, however, when political activists gathered outside the police station to protest for them.

References

Living people
Pashtun women
People from Killa Saifullah District
Pashtunkhwa Milli Awami Party politicians
1987 births
Balochistan MPAs 2013–2018
Pashtun Tahafuz Movement politicians
Pakistani prisoners and detainees
Women members of the Provincial Assembly of Balochistan
21st-century Pakistani women politicians